Francis Xavier Schmalzgrueber (9 October 1663 – 7 November 1735) was a German Jesuit canonist.

Schmalzgrueber was born at Griesbach, Bavaria.  Entering the Society of Jesus in 1679, he made his studies at Ingolstadt, obtaining the doctorate both in theology and canon law. He taught humanities at Munich, Dillingen, and Neuburg; philosophy at Mindelheim, Augsburg, and Ingolstadt; dogmatic theology at Innsbruck and Lucerne. From 1703 to 1716 (with an interruption of two years when he occupied the chair of moral theology) he was professor of canon law, alternating between Dillingen and Ingolstadt. He was twice chancellor of the University of Dillingen; for two years censor of books for the Jesuits at Rome, and for a like period prefect of studies at Munich. He died at Dillingen, aged 72.

Works

His chief work, Jus Ecclesiasticum Universum, first published in Ingolstadt in 1817, underwent various editions, the last appearing at Rome (1843-5) in twelve quarto volumes. A compendium of this work was styled Succincta sacrorum canonum doctrina; another, Compendium juris ecclesiastici; both were published in Augsburg in 1747. Grandclaude's work (Paris, 1882-3) is practically a compendium of Schmalzgrueber.

Other writings are: Judicium ecclesiasticum, Clerus saecularis et regularis, Sponsalia et matrimonia, Crimen fori ecclesiastici, Consilia seu responsa Juris; all appeared at Augsburg between 1712 and 1722.

See also

References

Mederer, Annales Ingolstadiensis Academiae, III (Ingolstadt, 1782), 142
Augustin de Backer, Bibliothèque, ed. 
Carlos Sommervogel, VII (1896), 795 sq.
Allg. Realencyk. (Ratisbon, 1886).

External links
Source

1663 births
1735 deaths
17th-century German Jesuits
Canon law jurists
18th-century German Jesuits